The 2017–18 Penn State Lady Lions basketball team represented Pennsylvania State University during the 2017–18 NCAA Division I women's basketball season. The Lady Lions, led by 11th-year head coach Coquese Washington, played their home games at the Bryce Jordan Center as members of the Big Ten Conference. They finished the season of 16–16, 6–10 in Big Ten play to finish in a tie for sixth place. They defeated Illinois in the first round of the Big Ten women's tournament before losing to Michigan. They received an at-large to the Women's National Invitation Tournament where they lost to Radford in the first round.

Previous season 
The Lady Lions finished the 2016–17 season 21–11, 9–7 in Big Ten play to finish in a tie for sixth place. They lost in the second round of the Big Ten women's tournament to Minnesota. They were invited to the Women's National Invitation Tournament where they defeated Ohio and Fordham before losing to Virginia Tech in the third round.

Roster

Schedule and results

|-
! colspan="9" style="background:#1C3C6B; color:white;"| Non-conference regular season

|-
! colspan="9" style="background: #1C3C6B; color:white;"| Big Ten conference season

|-

|-

|-
! colspan="9" style="background:#1C3C6B; color:white;"| Big Ten Women's Tournament

|-
! colspan="9" style="background:#1C3C6B; color:white;"| WNIT

Rankings

See also
 2017–18 Penn State Nittany Lions basketball team

References

Penn State Lady Lions basketball seasons
Penn State
Penn State
Penn State
Penn State